Gewirk, also known as the "Gawerk" or "Gewrek", are a Kurdish tribe inhabiting areas of modern-day Iran, Iraq and Turkey. The people of the Gewirk tribe mainly inhabit the following cities of Iran: Urmia, Sardasht , Rabat , Mahabad, Saqez, Boukan, Salmas and Shepiran. In Turkey, they mainly inhabit the following provinces and cities: Van, Başkale and Gürpınar. In Iraq, they mainly inhabit the following Shaqlawa district of Erbil.

The historical center of the Gewirk tribe is Rabat, a city in the West Azerbaijan province of Iran. 

The tribe is a part of the Billbas Tribal Federation  and with the members of the tribe speaking the Mokryan accent of the Kurdish language.

References

 Gewirk Tribe in history of Kurdistan, written by Mohsen Rashidi Gewirk

Kurdish tribes